Bent Creek Campus of the Appalachian Forest Experiment Station is a national historic district located near Asheville, in the Appalachian Mountains, Buncombe County, North Carolina.

The district encompasses 16 contributing buildings and 1 contributing structure associated with the Bent Creek Experimental Forest of the Pisgah National Forest.

Architecture
The campus has two sections: 
west section centered on an insectary and a garage dating to 1925–1928.
east section with laboratories, insectaries, residences, and auxiliary buildings dating to 1931–1934.

The buildings are typically one-story high (often with basement or garret stories), of frame construction in the Rustic Style.

It was listed on the National Register of Historic Places in 1993, with a boundary decrease in 1996.

References

Buildings and structures in Buncombe County, North Carolina
Government buildings on the National Register of Historic Places in North Carolina
Historic districts on the National Register of Historic Places in North Carolina
National Register of Historic Places in Buncombe County, North Carolina
Pisgah National Forest
Protected areas of the Appalachians
Rustic architecture in North Carolina